Donovan Leitch may refer to:

 Donovan (born 1946), British musician 
 Donovan Leitch (actor) (born 1967), his son, actor, former model and documentary filmmaker